Dancing with the Lion is Andreas Vollenweider's sixth studio album, released in 1989.

Co-produced by Eric Merz & Darryl Pitt. 
Executive Producers: Hanswalter Huggler & Hugo Fass. 
Recorded and mixed at Lakeside Recording Studio, Zurich, Switzerland. 
April–October 1988

The title song made an appearance in the Canadian AC charts on August 7, 1989, at #17.

Track listing
 "Unto the Burning Circle" - 3:48
 "Dancing With The Lion" - 4:00
 "Hippolyte" - 1:11
 "Dance Of The Masks" - 5:51
 "Pearls & Tears" - 5:02
 "Garden Of My Childhood" - 1:47
 "Still Life" - 5:40
 "And The Long Shadows" - 3:37
 "See, My Love..." - 3:03
 "Silver Dew, Golden Grass" - 0:59
 "Ascent From The Circle" - 4:01

Personnel
Andreas Vollenweider: Electracoustic Harp, Cheng, Voice & other instruments
Christoph Stiefel: Piano & other Keyboards
Pedro Haldemann: Percussion
Walter Keiser: Drums & Percussion
Matthias Ziegler: Flutes
Guest Instrumentalists:
Hans Bergstrom: French Horn
Beat Briner: Bassoon
Fernando Fantini: Accordion
Charly Fassler: French Horn
Steve Gorn: Bansuri Bamboo Flutes
Hanspeter Hass: Bass Trombone
Peter Keiser: Bass.
Max Lässer: Acoustic Guitar.
David Lindley: Lap Steel Guitar, Turkish Saz.
Marilyn Mazur: Percussion.
Marl O'Connor: Violin & Mandolin.
Burhan Oecal: Darabuka. 
Christian Ostermeier: Tenor Saxophone.
Luis Perez: Mesoamerican Wind & Percussion. 
Daniel Pezzotti: Cello.
Badal Roy: Tabla.
Janne Schaffer: Electric Guitar & Guitarsitar.
Roman Schwind: English Horn, Oboe.
THE ZURICH MANDOLIN PLAYERS, Conducted by HORST HAGEMANN.

References

1989 albums
Andreas Vollenweider albums